Gabrska Gora may refer to 
Gabrska Gora, Litija, a settlement in the Municipality of Litija in central Slovenia
Gabrška Gora, a settlement in the Municipality of Škofja Loka in the Upper Carniola region of Slovenia